The Zawawi Cup is a Listed flat horse race in Sweden open to thoroughbreds aged three years or older. It is run over a distance of 1,200 metres (about 6 furlongs) at Jägersro in July. It is one of the few Group or Listed races in Europe to be run on a dirt surface.

History
The event is sponsored by Dr Omar Zawawi, a leading racehorse owner in Scandinavia. It was formerly known as the Zawawi Baltic Cup.

For a period the race held Listed status. It was promoted to Group 3 level in 2013 and downgraded back to Listed status in 2019.

Prior to 2014 the Zawawi Cup was run in August, usually on the same day as the Svenskt Derby.

Records
Most successful horse (4 wins):
 Sharp Matt – 1995, 1996, 1997, 1998

Leading jockey (5 wins):
 Janos Tandari – Boobe Grand (1980, 1981), Miami Flyer (1986), Simon Sacc (1990), Glenlivet (1992)

Leading trainer (5 wins):
 Einar Jardby – Cocktail Queen (1958, 1960), Prinsen (1962), Carneval (1963), Super Scot (1972)

Winners since 1977

Earlier winners

 1941: Sidenhuset II
 1942: Maclean
 1943: Marschal
 1944: Magdalena
 1945: Ayah
 1946: Lamara
 1947: Capriole
 1948: Dandle
 1949: Safari
 1950: Faithful
 1951: Flying Fire
 1952: Bolero
 1953: Irmina
 1954: Norman
 1955: Mercurius
 1956: Mercurius
 1957: Melchior
 1958: Cocktail Queen
 1959: Donoak
 1960: Cocktail Queen
 1961: Palladium
 1962: Prinsen
 1963: Carneval
 1964: Salerno
 1965: Fair Lot
 1966: Roman Wedding
 1967: Rebell Fortuna
 1968: Rebell Fortuna
 1969: Prior
 1970: Prior
 1971: Komarov
 1972: Super Scot
 1973: Chene
 1974: Super Scot
 1975: Super Scot
 1976: Kangetu

See also
 List of Scandinavian flat horse races

References

 Racing Post / jagersro.se:

 jagersro.se – Zawawi Cup.
 Internanational Federation of Horseracing Authorities Zawwai Cup (2017)

Open sprint category horse races
Sport in Malmö
Horse races in Sweden
Summer events in Sweden